The 2000 Polynesian Championships in Athletics took place in 2000. The event was held in Apia, Samoa.

A total of 32 events were contested, 18 by men and 14 by women.

Medal summary
Medal winners and their results were published on the Athletics Weekly webpage.

Men

Women

Medal table (unofficial)

References

Polynesian Championships in Athletics
Athletics in Samoa
International sports competitions hosted by Samoa
Polynesian Championships
2000 in Samoan sport